Horsfieldia nervosa is a species of plant in the family Myristicaceae. It is a tree endemic to Borneo where it is confined to Sarawak.

References

nervosa
Endemic flora of Borneo
Flora of Sarawak
Trees of Borneo
Vulnerable flora of Asia
Taxonomy articles created by Polbot